The Civil Aviation Authority of Islamic Republic of Iran (CAA.IRI), is Iran's civil aviation agency. It is the statutory corporation which oversees and regulates all aspects of civil aviation in Iran. The organization was established in July 1946 and its headquartered at Mehrabad International Airport in Tehran. It investigates aviation accidents and incidents in Iran.

Responsibilities
The CAA.IRI responsibilities are:

 Iran's skies Rules and Regulation
 Professional and private pilots 
 Licensed aircraft engineers  
 Air traffic controllers 
 Airlines 
 Licensed aerodromes 
 Organisations involved in the design (DO), production (PO), continuing airworthiness management (CAMO) and maintenance (AMO) of aeronautical products 
 Organisations involved in the training of pilot (ATO), air traffic controller and maintenance engineer (MTO)
 Aircraft registered in Iran
 Aero-Medical Centres (AeMC)

Previous Flight Calibration Service Fleet 
 Beechcraft F33C Bonanza: Flight Service, registration mark EP-BAO. Derelict at Arak Airport
 Dassault Falcon (Mystere) 20E: Flight Calibration Service, registration mark EP-FIC (since 09 Sep 1975). Crashed while performing navigational aide calibration at Kish International Airport on 3 March 2014.
 Dassault Falcon 2000EX: Flight Calibration Service, registration mark EP-FSC
 Rockwell 500S Shrike Commander: Registration mark EP-MAA, scrapped at Tehran-Ghaleh Morghi Airport in 2011.

See also

 List of airlines of Iran
 List of airports in Iran
 Ministry of Roads & Urban Development
 Iranian Airports Holding Company
 Islamic Republic of Iran Air Force
 List of the busiest airports in Iran

References

External links
Official website 
Official website 

Government of Iran
Aviation organisations based in Iran
Organizations investigating aviation accidents and incidents
Iran
Civil aviation in Iran
Aviation authorities